Cryo-adsorption is a method used for hydrogen storage where gaseous hydrogen at cryogenic temperatures (150—60 K) is physically adsorbed on porous material, mostly activated carbon. The achievable storage density is between liquid-hydrogen (LH2) storage systems and compressed-hydrogen (CGH2) storage systems.

See also
 Hydrogen tank
 Hydrogen economy

References

External links
 Hydrogen cryo-adsorption; comparing low pressure and isosteric heats

Separation processes
Cryogenics
Hydrogen technologies
Hydrogen storage